Tolovitsa is a village in northwestern Bulgaria. It is in Vidin region and Makresh Municipality. It is one of the smallest villages in the region with only 65 inhabitants.

Geography 
The village is located near the Rabisha lake and Magura cave. There are two rivers that flow near the village - "Tolovishka bara" and "Svadbitsa".

Villages in Vidin Province